For the Love of God is a Canadian drama film, directed by Micheline Lanctôt and released in 2011. Based in part on a personal experience from Lanctôt's own childhood, the film centres on the sexual awakening of Léonie (Ariane Legault), a young girl attending convent school in 1959 who falls in love with Father Malachy (Victor Andrés Trelles Turgeon), the new school priest, and becomes jealous when she realizes that her teacher, Sister Cécile (Madeleine Péloquin), is also in love with him. The film also explores the effect of the experience on the three into the present day, with Lanctôt herself playing the role of the adult Léonie, Geneviève Bujold as the senior Sister Cécile and Nelson Villagra as the senior Fr. Malachy.

Rossif Sutherland also has a small role in the film as Jesus.

The film premiered on August 24, 2011 at the Angoulême Film Festival, where it won awards for Best Actress (Péloquin) and Best Film. It opened commercially in Quebec on September 2.

The film received six Jutra Award nominations at the 14th Jutra Awards, for Best Director (Lanctôt), Best Actress (Péloquin), Best Art Direction (Normand Sarazin), Best Cinematography (Michel La Veaux), Best Costume Design (François Barbeau) and Best Original Music (Catherine Major). Barbeau won the award for costume design.

At the Shanghai International Film Festival in 2012, the film won the Golden Goblet Jury Grand Prix.

References

External links

2011 films
Canadian coming-of-age drama films
Films directed by Micheline Lanctôt
Films shot in Montreal
Films set in Montreal
2011 drama films
French-language Canadian films
2010s Canadian films